Ayhanlar Dam is a dam in Nevşehir Province, Turkey, built between 1996 and 2000.

See also
List of dams and reservoirs in Turkey

External links
DSI

Dams in Nevşehir Province
Dams completed in 2000